June 25 - Eastern Orthodox Church calendar - June 27

All fixed commemorations below celebrated on July 9 by Orthodox Churches on the Old Calendar.

For June 26th, Orthodox Churches on the Old Calendar commemorate the Saints listed on June 13.

Saints
 Venerable David of Thessalonica (David the Dendrite) (540)
 Venerable John, Bishop of Gothia in the Crimea (c. 787)
 Venerable Anthion, ascetic.

Pre-Schism Western saints
 Saints John and Paul, martyrs who suffered in Rome. (c. 361-363)
 Saint Vigilius of Trent, a Roman noble who studied in Athens, he became Bishop of Trent in Italy and more or less succeeded in uprooting paganism (405)
 Saint Maxentius (Maixent), born in Agde in France, he became a monk at a monastery in Poitou, now called Saint-Maixent, where he later became abbot (c. 515)
 Saint Barbolenus, a monk at Luxeuil Abbey and afterwards first Abbot of St Peter's, later St Maur-des-Fossés, in the north of France (c. 677)
 Saint Perseveranda (Pecinna, Pezaine), a holy virgin from Spain (c. 726)
 Saints Salvius and Superius (c. 768)
 Saint Corbican, born in Ireland, he lived as a hermit in Holland and helped simple people (8th century)
 Martyr Pelagius of Córdoba (Pelayo), a young boy from Asturias in Spain left as a hostage with the Moors in Cordoba (925)
 Saint Hermogius, founder of Labrugia Monastery in Spanish Galicia (c. 942)

Post-Schism Orthodox saints
 Saint Dionysius, Archbishop of Suzdal, then Metropolitan of Kiev and all Rus' (1385)  (see also: October 15)
 New Martyr David of St. Anne’s Skete on Mount Athos, martyred in Thessaloniki (1813)

New martyrs and confessors
 New Hieromartyr George Stepanyuk, Priest (1918)

Icons
 Icon of the Most Holy Theotokos "Of Lydda" or "The Roman" (1st century)
 Icon of the Mother of God "Neamts" (1399)
 Icon of the Mother of God "Of the Seven Lakes", Kazan (17th century)
 Appearance of the Tikhvin Icon of the Most Holy Theotokos (1383)

Other commemorations
 Translation of the relics of Saint Brannock of Braunton (Brynach), Abbot of Braunton, Devonshire (6th century)  (see also: January 7)
 Uncovering of the relics (1569) of Saint Tikhon of Lukhov (1503)
 Translation of the relics (1995) of St. Nilus of Stolobny (1554)  (see also: May 27)

Icon gallery

Notes

References

Sources
 June 26/July 9. Orthodox Calendar (PRAVOSLAVIE.RU).
 July 9 / June 26. HOLY TRINITY RUSSIAN ORTHODOX CHURCH (A parish of the Patriarchate of Moscow).
 June 26. OCA - The Lives of the Saints.
 The Autonomous Orthodox Metropolia of Western Europe and the Americas (ROCOR). St. Hilarion Calendar of Saints for the year of our Lord 2004. St. Hilarion Press (Austin, TX). p. 47.
 The Twenty-Sixth Day of the Month of June. Orthodoxy in China.
 June 26. Latin Saints of the Orthodox Patriarchate of Rome.
 The Roman Martyrology. Transl. by the Archbishop of Baltimore. Last Edition, According to the Copy Printed at Rome in 1914. Revised Edition, with the Imprimatur of His Eminence Cardinal Gibbons. Baltimore: John Murphy Company, 1916. p. 186.
 Rev. Richard Stanton. A Menology of England and Wales, or, Brief Memorials of the Ancient British and English Saints Arranged According to the Calendar, Together with the Martyrs of the 16th and 17th Centuries. London: Burns & Oates, 1892. p. 291.

 Greek Sources
 Great Synaxaristes:  26 ΙΟΥΝΙΟΥ. ΜΕΓΑΣ ΣΥΝΑΞΑΡΙΣΤΗΣ.
  Συναξαριστής. 26 Ιουνίου. ECCLESIA.GR. (H ΕΚΚΛΗΣΙΑ ΤΗΣ ΕΛΛΑΔΟΣ). 
  26 Ιουνίου. Αποστολική Διακονία της Εκκλησίας της Ελλάδος (Apostoliki Diakonia of the Church of Greece).
  26/06/2018. Ορθόδοξος Συναξαριστής.

 Russian Sources
  9 июля (26 июня). Православная Энциклопедия под редакцией Патриарха Московского и всея Руси Кирилла (электронная версия). (Orthodox Encyclopedia - Pravenc.ru).
  26 июня по старому стилю / 9 июля по новому стилю. Русская Православная Церковь - Православный церковный календарь на 2017 год.
  26 июня (ст.ст.) 9 июля 2014 (нов. ст.). Русская Православная Церковь Отдел внешних церковных связей. (DECR).

June in the Eastern Orthodox calendar